Liana Kayla-Marie Hinds (born 23 February 1995) is an American-born Trinidadian footballer who plays as a defender for Hibernian and the Trinidad and Tobago women's national team.

College career
Hinds attended the University of Connecticut.

International career
Hinds represented Trinidad and Tobago at the 2010 FIFA U-17 Women's World Cup, the 2012 CONCACAF Women's U-17 Championship and the 2014 CONCACAF Women's U-20 Championship. She made her senior debut in 2014.

International goals
Scores and results list Trinidad and Tobago's goal tally first

References

1995 births
Living people
Women's association football defenders
Women's association football midfielders
Trinidad and Tobago women's footballers
Trinidad and Tobago women's international footballers
Competitors at the 2018 Central American and Caribbean Games
Trinidad and Tobago expatriate women's footballers
Trinidad and Tobago expatriate sportspeople in Sweden
Expatriate women's footballers in Sweden
Women's association football forwards
American women's soccer players
Soccer players from Connecticut
Sportspeople from Hartford, Connecticut
UConn Huskies women's soccer players
American expatriate women's soccer players
American expatriate sportspeople in Sweden
Sundsvalls DFF players
Elitettan players
Loomis Chaffee School alumni
Hibernian W.F.C. players
Expatriate women's footballers in Scotland